A list of animated feature films first released in 1992.

Highest-grossing animated films of 1992

See also
 List of animated television series of 1992

References

Feature films 
1992
1992-related lists